Orbivestus bamendae is a plant in the family Asteraceae.

Description
The leaves are sessile. The inflorescences feature purple florets.

Distribution and habitat
Orbivestus bamendae is native to Cameroon's Bamenda Highlands and their continuation as Nigeria's Mambilla Plateau. The species' range is considered to be very small.

References

Vernonieae
Flora of Cameroon
Flora of Nigeria
Plants described in 1957
Taxobox binomials not recognized by IUCN